Young Machetes is the fifth and final studio album by the American post-hardcore band The Blood Brothers, which was released October 10, 2006. Lyrically, the album "remains firmly rooted in the surreal consciousness, rage and oblique politics the Blood Brothers have always embraced. It also reveals a new, once-bitten wisdom." Heather Phares of Allmusic said of the album:

Track listing
 "Set Fire to the Face on Fire" - 2:19
 "We Ride Skeletal Lightning" - 3:22
 "Laser Life" - 2:44
 "Camouflage, Camouflage" - 4:54
 "You're the Dream Unicorn!" - 2:18
 "Vital Beach" - 2:35
 "Spit Shine Your Black Clouds" - 4:20
 "1, 2, 3, 4 Guitars" - 3:35
 "Lift the Veil, Kiss the Tank" - 4:05
 "Nausea Shreds Yr Head" - 2:10
 "Rat Rider" - 2:03
 "Johnny Ripper" - 2:39
 "Huge Gold AK-47" - 2:31
 "Street Wars/Exotic Foxholes" - 5:31
 "Giant Swan" - 5:51

2009 re-issue bonus tracks

 "Laser Life (Nick Zinner Remix)" - 2:49
 "Nausea Shreds Yr Head (Gajamagic remix)" - 2:47
 "Street Wars/Exotic Foxholes - (Gajamagic remix)" - 3:45
 "We Ride Skeletal Lightning" - Live (KXLU 2006) - 3:31
 "Laser Life" - Live (KXLU 2006) - 2:43
 "Camouflage, Camouflage" - Live (KXLU 2006) - 4:59
 "Lift the Veil, Kiss the Tank" - Live (KXLU 2006) - 4:04
 "Vital Beach" - Live (KXLU 2006) - 2:34
 "You're the Dream Unicorn!" - Live (KXLU 2006) - 2:11
 "Giant Swan" - Live (KXLU 2006) - 5:48

Vinyl releases
First Press:
800 - 180 Gram Black
440 - Black/White
440 - Translucent Blue/Black Splatter
440 - LP1: Green/Grey, LP2: Orange/Yellow
440 - Metallic Grey
440 - White

Second Press:
361 - Light Blue
354 - Orange/Black Splatter
362 - Half Black/Half White/Red Splatter

Personnel

Performers
Jordan Blilie - vocals
Mark Gajadhar - drums
Morgan Henderson - bass, keyboards
Cody Votolato - guitar
Johnny Whitney - vocals, Wurlitzer piano, guitar

References

2006 albums
The Blood Brothers (band) albums
V2 Records albums
Albums produced by John Goodmanson
Albums produced by Guy Picciotto
Albums recorded at Robert Lang Studios